Scott and Sid is a 2018 British coming-of-age feature film directed, written and produced by Scott Elliott and Sid Sadowskyj. Based on the filmmakers’ real lives, this tale evolves around the lives of the two male protagonists as they strive to fulfill a list of ambitions made when they were 15, with the ultimate goal to make a film before they reach the age of thirty. The film stars Richard Mason and Tom Blyth, both making their debuts as the lead characters in the film, whilst Charlotte Milchard takes on the supporting role as Sid's mum. The film was theatrically released in the UK in March 2018, by Dreamchasers Film Ltd.

Plot  
Scott and Sid recount their story to a taxi driver, unfolding in flashbacks.

As schoolboys growing up in York, the pair were isolated, underachieving and a little lost. While Scott was an uncontainable and frantic youth, Sid was a more reserved and awkward teen. Both were weighed down by their chaotic lives; Scott, an unloved foster child, was expelled from multiple schools for his unruly behaviour and Sid, the son of an alcoholic Karen and an absent father, was caught buying alcohol underage and swept up in a dodgy scheme selling alcohol for gangsters. Both are ridiculed by their teacher when they contemplate what the future holds for them and despairing of the compromise and limited ambitions around them, they are united by friendship.

In defiance of the low expectations that everyone had for them, Scott and Sid wrote a list of goals and began pursuing each one in turn to create a better life. The overly serious Sid is inspired by Scott's wild and untamed spirit, while Scott draws strength from Sid's boundless work ethic and determination to get ahead. They call themselves "Dreamchasers", building their whole lifestyle and ideology around pushing themselves farther and faster than anyone expects. Fuelled by ambition and entrepreneurial spirit they launch two successful businesses while still at school. However, lies and deceit soon tarnish the friendship.

Overcoming their troubles, they continue to strive to be better and even at the age of 24, it is not enough to have a successful media business, they want more. Item number one on their list of dreams remains: to make a film. Chasing their biggest dream yet, they embark on their journey.

Cast

Production 
The film was developed and produced by Elsa Media.

Development 
 
From an early age, both Elliott and Sadowskyj knew they wanted to make a film. At the age of 15, they wrote down a list of everything they wanted to achieve in their lives and set about accomplishing them. Fuelled by an entrepreneurial drive, they launched two successful businesses while still at school, beginning with door-to-door oven cleaning. This semi-autobiographical story began with Elliott and Sadowskyj writing down significant moments from their lives, "culled directly from their shared experiences in publishing and event management and includes the moment when Scott met with loan sharks." Sadowskyj said that the light bulb moment that changed things for [them] was at 24, when Scott came into the office, said he wanted out of the business and, after an "awkward discussion", the pair got out a marker and circled "Make a Movie" and said "What's next?". From that moment [they] sold up and started to put 100% of [their] efforts into filmmaking.

Using elements of fiction to streamline the story or emphasis certain aspects of the characters, they wanted to be honest about the lows as well as the highs of their story together. Elliott's dyslexia meant that he did not learn how to write a professional script from reading books but by watching films, focusing on the structure, character, emotional beats and filmmaking techniques used in the films.

Pre-production 
Having never made a film before, Elliott and Sadowskyj began months of preparation after the script was formed. Taking advice from people in the industry, they set about finding investors for the film and after a year-long campaign, they were successful. The "gruelling" process also gave them a key piece of inspiration for the film's structure as the story unfolds in flashbacks as the pair travel in a taxi to an important meeting. Elliott and Sadowskyj always planned on making the film in the North of England. Wanting to "tell a positive story about an area too often dismissed as grim or depressing", the pair made use of many locations in Yorkshire. Making "the most of Yorkshire's spectacular natural beauty and the Northern English character", the duo used their close ties to the community to find buildings to use around York, Leeds, Bradford, and the surrounding areas.

Production 
Principal photography on the film began in May 2015. Filmed on location in-and-around York, Leeds, and Bradford, Scott and Sid took over seven weeks to shoot. Sadowskyj took on the role of unit manager and location manager while on set, before settling into a more traditional role of producer. Elliott, a very actor-orientated director, worked closely with Blyth and Mason, pushing them into their characters more.

Post-production 
Working with editor Andy Morrison to bring the film together and create the director's cut,  Elliott and Sadowskyj focused on creating the finished film. With the use of focus groups and test audiences, they refined and re-cut the film, and when Morrison had to move on to another job, Chris Gill ACE, who previously worked on The Best Exotic Marigold Hotel and 28 Days Later, joined the crew.

Music  
The musical score for Scott and Sid was composed by film and television composer Ian Arber. Arber's compositional approach makes use of minimal orchestral instruments with cello-lead melodic phrases and intricate percussive and atmospheric elements throughout his scores.

Themes  
The film explores the theme of dreamchasing; having the ambition to chase your dreams, Scott and Sid aims to encourage people to get moving and chase their dreams, with a strong moral to the story that if you believe in yourself, you can do anything. The film, which at one point was going to be called Dreamchaser is a testament to dreaming big but living in the real world when it comes to filmmaking. Based on a true story drawn from the lives of the writer-producer-director team, it is a film about the themes of hope, ambition, and success.

Critical response 
The film received a range of positive reviews from film critics. Alex Clement from HeyUGuys said "This film feels more like a sense of achievement rather than your typical blockbuster movie..it brings out the personalities of the real men behind this story and they finally get to tell it to the world. It’s a powerful statement to people watching, it says you can do whatever you want if you try hard enough. There is no dream too big and anything is possible if you believe in yourself." Ed Edwards of The Upcoming said "the drive to spread their wings and prove they are made of something special – even just to themselves – is conveyed wonderfully and is certainly sufficient on its own, making Scott and Sid a gripping success story that is well worth watching." Katherine Flint-Nicol of BritFlicks said: "What is refreshing about the film, also holds the film back. Its desire to be persistently feel-good steers it away from what could have been interesting avenues to go down. However, there is creativity here. The narrative structure is played with, reminiscent of Nick Hamms’, Martha meet Frank, Daniel and Laurence. The film could have benefitted from a summer release. This upbeat film is made for sunny days." Allan Hunter of the Daily Express rated the film 4 out of 5 stars.

Prints  
A limited-edition print collection focused on the film has also been created. Hoping to "recapture the wildness of youth," the collection is the "brainchild" of filmmakers Scott Elliott and Sid Sadowskyj and is inspired by the "thoughts, memories and adventures of their own childhood." The images help "capture the purity of friendship between the two protagonists and reflect their shared spirit of adventure".

Novelization  
Based on the screenplay of Scott and Sid, and written by Ali Wright, this story of friendship and coming-of-age details how the duo broke free from their dysfunctional lives as they strived to be more than normal.   
The book details the highs and lows of the pair's true story and allows for readers to learn more about how Elliott and Sadowskyj progressed from their dream to raising the funds to make their first feature film. Scott and Sid: The Novel is available on iBooks and Kindle and available to buy as paperback / hardcover.

Awards and nominations  
Scott and Sid won two awards: Best British Film and Best Supporting Actress (for Charlotte Milchard) at the National Film Awards UK 2019 and was nominated for Best Drama but lost to Yardie.

References

External links  
 
 Official website

Trailer  
 Scott and Sid film trailer

Films set in Yorkshire
Films shot in Yorkshire
Films shot in England
Films shot in London
Films set in England
2018 films
2010s coming-of-age drama films
British drama films
2018 directorial debut films
2018 drama films
2010s English-language films
2010s British films